The 1999 PBA season was the 25th season of the Philippine Basketball Association (PBA).

Season highlights
A new era began with the entry of Fil-foreign cagers such as Asi Taulava and Eric Menk. 
During the opening ceremonies, the PBA honored basketball greats in their respective era as the all-time first five, nominated in each decade from 1950s–1990s were Caloy Loyzaga, Narciso Bernardo, Robert Jaworski, Hector Calma and Alvin Patrimonio, surprisingly absent from the list was Ramon Fernandez, who was then the MBA Commissioner.
The opening ceremonies for the said season went head-to-head against the opening ceremonies of rival league, MBA, involving the TV network war. The PBA sought the alliance of GMA Network who facilitated their opening ceremonies while MBA used ABS-CBN's roster of stars for its opening ceremonies.  
The PBA transferred from the Cuneta Astrodome to the PhilSports Arena as their main playing venue.
The league changes their playdates from Tuesdays, Fridays, and Sundays to Wednesdays, Fridays and Sundays. Friday games were still held exclusively at the Araneta Coliseum while the Sunday games are played at the PhilSports Arena.
The Tanduay Rhum Masters returned to the PBA after a 12-year absence.
During the off-season, the league allowed each team to have a direct-hire Filipino-Foreigner recruit as their answer to the increasing popularity of rival basketball league, the Metropolitan Basketball Association.
Formula Shell became the 10th team to win the All-Filipino crown, and won their first back-to-back championships, the underdog Shell team led by Benjie Paras, Victor Pablo and Gerry Esplana, defied the odds by beating the stronger Tanduay ballclub, composed of powerhouse rookies Sonny Alvarado, Mark Telan, Chris Cantonjos and Eric Menk.   
The San Miguel Beermen, under new coach Jong Uichico, ended a five-year title-drought and won the final two conferences of the season to tie the legendary Crispa Redmanizers for the most championships with 13.

Opening ceremonies
The muses for the participating teams are as follows:

1999 PBA All-Filipino Cup

Elimination round

Playoffs

Finals 

|}

1999 PBA Commissioner's Cup

Elimination round

Playoffs

Finals 

|}

1999 PBA Governors' Cup

Elimination round

Playoffs

Finals 

|}

Awards
 Most Valuable Player: Benjie Paras (Shell)
 Rookie of the Year:  Danny Seigle (San Miguel)
 Sportsmanship Award: Rey Evangelista (Purefoods)
 Most Improved Player: Elmer Lago (Ginebra)
 Defensive Player of the Year: Chris Jackson (Formula Shell)
 Mythical Five
 Johnny Abarrientos (Alaska)
 Jeffrey Cariaso (Mobiline)
 Sonny Alvarado (Tanduay)
 Benjie Paras (Shell)
 Danny Seigle (San Miguel)
 Mythical Second Team
 Olsen Racela (San Miguel)
 Danny Ildefonso (San Miguel)
 Eric Menk (Tanduay)
 Jojo Lastimosa (Alaska)
 Kenneth Duremdes (Alaska)
 All Defensive Team
 Chris Jackson (Shell)
 Freddie Abuda (San Miguel)
 Johnny Abarrientos (Alaska)
 Dindo Pumaren (Purefoods)
 Eric Menk (Tanduay)

Awards given by the PBA Press Corps
 Coach of the Year:Perry Ronquillo (Shell)
 Mr. Quality Minutes: Rodney Santos (Alaska)
 Executive of the Year: Jun Bernardino (PBA commissioner)
 Comeback Player of the Year: Benjie Paras (Shell)
 Referee of the Year: Ernie de Leon

Cumulative standings

References

 
PBA